Dimethylbutanol may refer to:

 2,2-Dimethyl-1-butanol
 3,3-Dimethyl-1-butanol (DMB)

See also
 Dimethylbutane
 Hexanol